An atom smasher is a particle accelerator.

Atom smasher may also refer to:

Atom-Smasher (Marvel Comics), two Marvel Comics characters
Atom Smasher, or Albert Rothstein, a DC Comics superhero
The Westinghouse Atom Smasher
Atomsmasher, or Phantomsmasher, American experimental band